Fawaz Saleh Al-Khaibari (born January 6, 1992) is a Saudi Arabian international footballer who plays for Al-Dera'a as a goalkeeper.

References

1992 births
Living people
Saudi Arabian footballers
Sportspeople from Jeddah
Association football goalkeepers
Al-Ansar FC (Medina) players
Ittihad FC players
Al-Hazem F.C. players
Al-Majd Club players
Al Ghazwah FC players
Al-Riyadh SC players
Al-Dahab Club players
Al-Dera'a FC players
Saudi Professional League players
Saudi First Division League players
Saudi Second Division players
Saudi Third Division players
Saudi Arabia international footballers